Howard J. "Howie" Rajala (born February 12, 1962) is a Canadian curler from Kanata, Ontario. He curls out of the Rideau Curling Club.

Born in Sault Ste. Marie, Ontario, Rajala was a member of the Rich Moffatt rink that won the provincial championship in 1999. Rajala played third for that team that went 6–5 at the 1999 Labatt Brier.

In 1998, he was a member of the team that won The Dominion Regalia Silver Tankard for the Rideau Curling Club.

In 2001, Rajala won the Ontario Mixed title with teammates Darcie Simpson, Chris Fulton and Linda Fulton. This qualified his team to represent Ontario at the 2001 Canadian Mixed Curling Championship. The team finished the round robin with a 7–4 record in a massive 7-way tie for first place. After defeating British Columbia (skipped by Wes Craig) in their first tie breaker game, the lost in their second tie breaker game to Saskatchewan (skipped by Scott Coghlan).

With Moffatt, Rajala went to seven provincial championships. He began skipping 2002 and played in three more championships as skip (2003, 2008, 2011).

Rajala won the 2013 Ontario Senior Curling championships with Moffatt at third, Doug Johnston and Ken Sullivan. They represented Ontario at the 2013 Canadian Senior Curling Championships where they lost in the final to Wayne Tallon's New Brunswick rink.

Rajala won the 2017 Ontario Senior Curling championships They represented Ontario at the 2017 Canadian Senior Curling Championships where they lost in the final to Wade White's Alberta rink. Rajala won the 2022 Ontario Seniors as well, and went on to win the 2022 Canadian Senior Curling Championships.

References

External links
 
 1999 Labatt Brier
 2001 Canadian Mixed
 'Re-energized' Rajala ready to rock - Toronto Sun

1962 births
Living people
Curlers from Ottawa
Sportspeople from Sault Ste. Marie, Ontario
Canadian engineers
Canadian male curlers